Hedgehog Island is a small, bare granite island, or stack, in Moubray Bay, Antarctica  south of Helm Point. It was first visited in 1957 by a small party from Hallett Station, and was so named by the New Zealand Geological Survey Antarctic Expedition, 1957–58, because of its shape.

See also 
 List of antarctic and sub-antarctic islands

References

Islands of Victoria Land
Borchgrevink Coast